Dorothy De Navarro (1901–1987) was a lecturer at the University of Cambridge, who specialised in Anglo-Saxon literature.

Academic career 
De Navarro, then Dorothy Hoare, was educated at Inverness Royal Academy and took her B.A. at Aberdeen University with First Class Honours in English and a Gold Medal. She took her M.A. in 1923.

She earned a Carnegie Fellowship from Aberdeen to continue her studies at the University of Cambridge from 1926-1929, residing in Newnham College. She took her PhD from Cambridge in 1929.

She worked as an Assistant Lecturer at Cambridge from 1930–1932, and was promoted to Lecturer of English from 1932–1949. She held positions at Newnham including member of council 1935–1941, 1951–1952 and Secretary 1936–1941. She was an Associate Fellow of Newnham from 1950–1952. She was a member of the faculty boards of English, Archaeology and Anthropology from 1936–1956. She lectured in early medieval literature.

De Navarro supervised Rachel Sheldon Bromwich as an undergraduate, Bomwich would go on to be an academic herself, publishing a "seminal" edition of the Welsh Triads, Trioedd Ynys Prydein, in 1961.

Published works 
Hoare published The Works of Morris and Yeats on relation to early Saga literature (1937), Some studies in the Modern Novel (1938), and an Introduction to Virginia Woolf's To the Lighthouse (1938). She edited with her husband, A.C. Jessup's The Lady of the Winding Stair and other poems (1957) and edited her father B.G. Hoare's Collection of Poems (1950). She also published in journals.

Legacy 
The Broadway Trust was established in 1963, to preserve the village of Broadway in the Cotswolds where the De Navarro home was located. Their home, Court Farm remains a significant cultural landmark, containing a rare preserved Edwardian garden.

De Navarro donated a 1882 platinotype cabinet card of Sir Edward Burne-Jones by Frederick Hollyer to the National Portrait Gallery, London.

Personal life 
Agnes Dorothy Mackenzie Hoare (known as Dorothy Hoare until her marriage, and thereafter Dorothy De Navarro) was born on 31 July 1901 in Inverness, Scotland. She was the daughter of a draper and his wife.

Hoare married Jose Maria “Toty” de Navarro in 1940, a former Fellow of Trinity College, Cambridge and lecturer in Archaeology. They had one child, Michael de Navarro.

Dorothy De Navarro met Gertrude Caton-Thompson, a famed archaeologist while both resided at Cambridge. They became good friends, and shared a house, along with Dorothy’s husband “Toty”. After De Navarro retired from teaching, Caton-Thompson moved with the De Navarro family to their home in Broadway, Worcestershire in 1956, which would become their shared home until their respective deaths. It would become a popular destination for writers and musicians to visit, as it had been during Toty De Navarro's youth when his mother, the actor Mary Anderson had first lived there.

Dorothy De Navarro died in Broadway, Worcestershire in 1987 and was survived by her son, Michael.

References

1901 births
1987 deaths
Alumni of the University of Aberdeen
Alumni of Newnham College, Cambridge